Harry Sawyer may refer to:
 Harry Sawyer (Australian rules footballer)
 Harry Sawyer (soccer), Australian association footballer
 Harry William Sawyer, American physician and politician
 Harry Sawyer (mobster), Jewish-American organized crime boss based in St. Paul, Minnesota

See also
 Harry Sawyerr, Ghanaian politician
 Harry Sawyerr (theologian), Sierra Leonean theologian